The 2011 Open International Féminin Midi-Pyrénées Saint-Gaudens Comminges was a professional tennis tournament played on outdoor clay courts. It was the 15th edition of the tournament which was part of the 2011 ITF Women's Circuit, offering a total of $50,000+H in prize money. It took place in Saint-Gaudens, France, on 9–15 May 2011.

Singles entrants

Seeds 

 Rankings are as of 2 May 2011

Other entrants 
The following players received wildcards into the singles main draw:
  Claire de Gubernatis
  Séverine Beltrame
  Claire Feuerstein
  Kristina Mladenovic

The following players received entry from the qualifying draw:
  Gail Brodsky
  Julie Coin
  Tara Moore
  Conny Perrin

Champions

Singles 

  Anastasia Pivovarova def.  Arantxa Rus 7–6(7–4), 6–7(3–7), 6–2

Doubles 

 Caroline Garcia /  Aurélie Védy def.  Anastasia Pivovarova /  Olga Savchuk 6–3, 6–3

External links 
 Official website
 ITF Search

2011 ITF Women's Circuit
2011 in French tennis
Engie